Gypsophila fastigiata, the fastigiate gypsophila, is a species of flowering plant of the family Caryophyllaceae.

References 

fastigiata
Plants described in 1753
Taxa named by Carl Linnaeus